Videha mukti ( meaning "liberation after death or literally liberation from the body") refers to the moksha (liberation from the death and rebirth cycle) after death. It is a concept found in Hinduism and Jainism in relation to ending the samsara (the cycle of death and rebirth). The concept contrasts with Jivanmukti, which refers to achieving "liberation while alive". The concepts of Jivanmukta and Videhamukta are particularly discussed in Vedanta and Yoga schools of Hindu philosophy.

The Hindu tradition holds that a human being is essentially a spiritual soul that has taken birth in a body. When a soul has attained mukti it is said to break free from the cycle of deaths and rebirths. As per Advaita Vedanta, a widespread Hindu philosophy, a soul can be emancipated either while living or after death. Videhamukti may signify the liberation while alive as the state beyond turiya, when mind dissolves and there is not the slightest distinction or duality. 
Liberation is the goal of each of the major world religions, and thus it serves as an integrating feature of the great religions, reconciling and integrating what appears on the surface to be differences in point of view. Meher Baba, who started out Zoroastrian, and was initially affected by a Muslim holy woman, and who integrated the Sufi (Islamic) and Vedantic (Hindu philosophical) ideas and terms, gives a very detailed and complete description of liberation in his book God Speaks, supplement 24.  Liberation is the end of the soul's journey, and therefore it is the ultimate goal and destination for each individual, and the goal of creation itself.

Jivanmukti

The Jivanmukta (one who is in Jivanmukti) has gained liberation while in the body, but in this case, the individual regains full awareness of the world, simultaneously with awareness of "The god is within me and everyone, everything" state. According to Advaita, a liberated human being (jivanmukta) has realised Brahman as his or her own true self and has achieved infinite knowledge. (See Atman.)When a Jivanmukta dies he becomes a Paramukta.

Videha
Videha Mukti is, according to Meher Baba, the ordinary mukti granted to exceptional people after they die, usually within 3 to 4 days after death. (This explanation requires further verification as the person names Maher Baba is not known to be an expert of Sanatan Vedic Dharma, nor there are any references provides lining up with the vedic versus or any other acceptable scriptures from Sanatan Vedic Dharma. ) Videha mukta souls experience infinite knowledge, infinite power and infinite bliss only after death while Jivanmukta experience these while alive and also after death i.e., after becoming Paramukta. Jivanmukta have a body while Paramukta and Videhmukta are bodyless and pure. 

In each of the other three types of mukti, liberation is gained during life, not after death.  In all cases, after the soul dissociates from the body, it eternally experiences infinite power, knowledge and bliss.  However, after the soul dissociates from the gross body and associates with the subtle body, the most important aspect of the experience is infinite bliss. Therefore, while there is a difference in the eternal experience of the souls who gain liberation during life and the experience of souls who gain liberation after death, the most important aspect of the experience is the same.

Videh
Videh mukti is gained while alive in the body, but Meher Baba points out that videh mukti applies where the liberated individual does not regain awareness of the world.  In most of the cases of veheh mukti, the soul remains associated with the body for 3 to 4 days and then dissociates.  Thus, the difference between Meher Baba's view and the traditional Hindu view is that, in videh mukti, the soul attains liberation 3 to 4 days before death, although this would not be apparent to the outside observer. The importance of this distinction is that such a soul literally experiences an eternal "I am God" state rather than being introduced to an afterlife of "I am infinite bliss."  That is, the soul who achieves videh mukti certainly experiences eternal infinite power, knowledge, and bliss, rather than perhaps qualifying as an exception to reincarnating, and instead given the experience of eternal Infinite Bliss.

The distinction that determines whether a soul has attained ordinary (videha) mukti or videh mukti is very fine.  According to Meher Baba, an incarnate soul attains God realization in two steps.  First the soul attains nirvana, the state of infinite vacuum—emptiness.  In the second step, the reality of godhood rushes into the emptiness of the nirvana state, and the divine state of nirvikalpa is attained.  This state is called Fanna-Fi-Allah by the Sufis.  This is the state of "I am God" in which the soul retains no consciousness of anything other than the "I am God" experience.  To attain this state of God realization (nirvikalpa samadhi or Fanna-Fi-Allah) the soul must first reach nirvana and experience that state of nothingness.

See also
 Involution (Meher Baba)
 God Speaks

References
 
 https://web.archive.org/web/20100613071024/http://ambppct.org/meherbaba/online.php

Hindu philosophical concepts
Death and Hinduism